Kasota may refer to:

 Kasota, Minnesota, U.S.
 Kasota Lake, a lake in Kandiyohi County, Minnesota
 Kasota Township, Le Sueur County, Minnesota
 Kasota limestone, a dolomitic limestone